Bulz is a commune in Bihor County, Crișana, Romania with a population of 2,321 people. It is composed of three villages: Bulz, Munteni and Remeți (Jádremete).

References

Bulz
Localities in Crișana